Stephen Peter Humphrys (born 15 September 1997) is an English professional footballer who plays as a forward for Scottish Premiership  club Heart of Midlothian on loan from Wigan Athletic

Club career

Fulham
On 17 December 2016, Humphrys made his professional debut in the EFL Championship against Derby County at Craven Cottage. He joined League One side Shrewsbury Town on loan for the rest of the season in January 2017.

On 31 January 2018, Fulham announced Humphrys would be joining Rochdale on loan for the remainder of the season.

Southend
On 19 January 2019, Humphrys joined Southend United on a permanent deal from Fulham, scoring two goals on his debut, in a 4–0 win at Bradford that same day.

On 25 February 2019, he suffered a collision with Accrington Stanley goalkeeper Johnny Maxted as he won a header which would result in a goal. In the process, he suffered a fractured cheekbone and eye socket and 15 broken bones in his face, leading to metal plates being inserted and the need for a face mask to be worn for the rest of the season. Following surgery in early March, he also underwent another operation after the end of the season.

On 5 May 2019 Humphrys came off the bench to score the winning goal for Southend in a 2–1 win over Sunderland. The goal saved Southend from relegation to League Two.

Rochdale
On 11 September 2020, Humphrys signed a two-year deal with Rochdale for an undisclosed fee.

Wigan Athletic
In July 2021 he joined Wigan Athletic. He scored his first goal for the club in an EFL Cup tie against Hull City on 10 August 2021.

Heart of Midlothian

In August 2022, Humphrys signed for Scottish Premiership team Hearts on a season long loan. He scored his first goal for the club in a league match against Kilmarnock on 9 October 2022.

Humphrys' place in Hearts folklore was sealed on 4 February 2023 when he scored from his own half in a 3–1 win over Dundee United.

Career statistics

References

External links
Profile on Fulham website

1997 births
Living people
English footballers
Association football forwards
English Football League players
Bury F.C. players
Fulham F.C. players
Shrewsbury Town F.C. players
Rochdale A.F.C. players
Scunthorpe United F.C. players
Wigan Athletic F.C. players
Footballers from Oldham
Heart of Midlothian F.C. players
Scottish Professional Football League players